Giovanni Tuccari (1667–1743) was an Italian painter during the Baroque period, active in  Sicily.

Tuccari was born in Messina. He was the son and pupil of Antonio Tuccari, an obscure painter. He excelled as a battle painter. He died of the plague. He was responsible for the frescos in the church of San Benedetto of Catania. Other examples of his work include four octagonal paintings in the sanctuary of the Church of Sant'Antonio, at Castiglione di Sicilia, and the Pinacoteca Zelantea in Acireale.

References

1667 births
1743 deaths
Painters from Messina
17th-century Italian painters
Italian male painters
18th-century Italian painters
Sicilian Baroque
Italian Baroque painters
Italian battle painters
18th-century deaths from plague (disease)
18th-century Italian male artists